Adel Aref  (born 2 March 1980) is a Tunisian former international tennis umpire and former Director of Cabinet of the President at Paris Saint Germain Football Club and PR Director for BeIN Sports.

Early life
Adel was born on March 2, 1980, in Tunis, Tunisia, to Mokhtar Aref and Fatma Dhouib Aref. The family moved to London when he was 5, with his two brothers, Mehdi and Bechir Aref.
He holds a Bachelor's degree from Lycée Gustave-Flaubert (La Marsa) and a Master's degree from International Business School Dubai Knowledge Village.

International tennis refereeing career

Upon returning to Tunisia at the age of 10, Adel Aref joined the Tennis Club of Tunis, where he played tennis for many years. When he joined the club, he had already learned three languages (Arabic, French, and English). Because Adel Aref was already passionate about events, he got hooked on refereeing. The International Tennis federation (ITF) executives spotted him and offered him a scholarship. Over the course of his career, he officiated over 2000 matches all over the world, from the African savannah to the Amazon and passing through Australia.

He umpired games at the world's most prestigious tennis tournaments, officiating 30 events per year on ATP and WTA Tours. In 2006, he became Director of Officiating in all of Africa and Middle East – overseeing 100+ officials.

The start of the Golden Boy era: Gold badge at 24
Adel was originally spotted at 16 on the tennis club courts in Tunis (Tunisia), where an injury prevented him from playing. His first satellite tournament was held in Portugal when he turned to refereeing. ITF awarded him the gold badge for the highest level of refereeing at the age of 24, making him the youngest professional referee in the sport. A position was then offered to him at the Qatar Tennis Federation, leading to a whole new chapter in his career.

Africa and Middle East Director of Referees

2006 Davis Cup
Throughout his career, he was the youngest international referee to be mounted on a chair, officiating seven Grand Slam finals, including the Australian Open, Roland Garros, Wimbledon, the US Open and three Olympic games. For the Olympic games in Athens 1996 and Beijing 2008, he was responsible for training official tennis referees.
At Davis Cup 2006, a heated encounter with a young Andy Murray made the headlines of many world top sports channels. Andy Murray insulted Adel Aref during a Davis Cup doubles match against Serbia and Montenegro, protesting a decision he felt was unjust. Two years later in Paris, Andy Murray apologized for his actions which cost him a fine of $2,500. 
. Speaking about the incident Aref said, “He apologised two years later in Paris. We then got closer when he came to Doha when I was working with the Qatar Tennis Federation. We spoke about it and now we laugh. He’s such a nice guy. I give him a lot of credit. He was young and the press were using everything against him.” 

Adel Aref was also involved the time at a tour event technology has been used by players to challenge a line judge's call.

Olympic Games
Adel Aref was responsible for training all of the tennis officials to Olympic standard in the lead-up to both the Athens and Beijing Olympic games. Over the course of his umpire career Aref officiated at seven Grand Slam Finals – Australian Open, Roland Garros, Wimbledon, US Open, and three career Olympic Games (Sydney 2000, Athens 2004, Beijing 2008).

Aref retired from umpiring in 2008 at the age of 28 following four years of officiating at the top level.

Qatar Tennis Federation 
In 2008, Adel Aref became the Director of Marketing, Branding, and Player Services at the Qatar Tennis Federation (QTF).

The QTF was set up to develop young Qatari tennis players and to promote tennis in Qatar, Adel Aref worked on events for the ATP, WTA and ITF in the tennis world. He also led the marketing campaigns for Sony Ericsson Championships Doha 2008–2010, Qatar ExxonMobil Open and Qatar Ladies Open which was awarded Best Event of the Year by the ATP.

Sacred Grounds on the Green Pitch: The PSG President Chief of Staff
Often described as a "very discreet man", Adel Aref served as chief of staff of the president of the PSG and was responsible for the Carré du Parc. With an impressive address book, it is he who attracts planetary stars such as Rihanna, Lenny Kravitz, Naomi Campbell, basketball player Stephen Curry, Robin Wright or Leonardo DiCaprio. A list of French national stars have also been part of the show. Stars like Patrick Bruel, Jamel Debbouze, Francis Huster, Gérard Darmon, Enrico Macias and Jean-Paul Belmondo have all been invited to the prestigious square.

In 2014, the power couple Beyoncé and Jay-Z made a sensational appearance at le Carré for the PSG-Barcelona game, once again demonstrating Adel's world-class network.

Le Carré: a delicate manoeuvre for a ticket to heaven
Le Carré or The Square becomes then the equivalent of a general theater, a new starred restaurant or a trendy boutique, where the whole of Paris is fighting to get a spot. Paris Saint-Germain often records more than 800 requests for major matches, such as those of the Champions League. They are studied, sorted out, and other potential guests are solicited by two full-time employees, under the meticulous supervision of Adel.
Over the past two years, there have been more requests than available places, which have increased from 146 to 242. Conversely, the task involves courting world stars whose social media presence and relays will contribute to the amplification of the brand globally.

PR / Marketing Director for BeIN Sports
Given his extensive experience in the sector, Adel Aref was selected by BeIN Sports to be their PR and Event director. Adel led PR campaigns for the 2022 FIFA World Cup, which was hosted in Qatar.

Managing Ons Jabeur
Ons Jabeur has been blazing a trail for Arab and African tennis for many years, reaching a career-high ranking of world and was the runner-up at Wimbledon and the US Open in 2022. In January 2023, Ons Jabeur announced joining Naomi Osaka’s agency Evolve and Adel Aref for representation. “Ons is family and her interest is my first priority” said Adel, “ I am confident that the partnership with Evolve and creating synergies between Stuart and us will take Ons to the next level and beyond. Like I always say “stronger together”.

The news provoked a massive wave of excitement within the Tennis world, not only in the MENA region but across the whole globe. "Some people just read that I was signing with Evolve, but they didn't read the other part, that I'm signing with my friend and Tunisian, Adel, who has known me for a long time," Jabeur told WTA Insider in Adelaide. "It's nice to sign with someone who knows my culture".

Adel, the experience creator
Aref has been involved in globally recognized events in entertainment, sports, and fashion. Organizing Roger Federer and Rafael Nadal's exhibition game in Doha in 2011 was one of his most memorable accomplishments. As part of the Qatar ExxonMobil Open, Aref invited superstar players to hit tennis balls on a court laid in Doha Bay waters to launch the 2011 ATP World Tour season. As Aref flew over the Inland Sea of Doha, he noticed a thin layer of sand that inspired him to organize a tennis match outside the city.

ITV Studios Consultant
Adel Aref, who was responsible for casting in the Maghreb and in France, spotted The Voice Arab 2019 winner Mehdi Ayachi.

Ambassador for the Darna Association
Adel Aref is also an ambassador for the DARNA association, which supports children without families. This association aims to provide homes and full care to these children so they can live a normal life. They are raised by a surrogate mother and receive the love they have always lacked.

CEO at AASolutions
Aref is the CEO of ​​AASolutions, an agency specialized in personal branding, business networking, luxury events and artistic careers management. Aref’s network allowed the company to count amongst its clients globally renowned brands like Victoria’s Secret, Galerie Lafayette les Champs Elysées, Elie Saab, Cannes Festival, The Voice, Qatar Tennis Federation, UEFA Champions League, Paris Saint-Germain, BeIN Sports and the FIFA World Cup Qatar 2022.

References

1980 births
Living people
Sportspeople from Paris
Tennis umpires
Paris Saint-Germain F.C. non-playing staff